The Nebraska State Bar Association (NSBA) is the integrated (mandatory) bar association of the US state of Nebraska.

History 
In 1937, the Nebraska State Bar Association was created by order of the Nebraska Supreme Court. Its predecessor was a voluntary organization, the Nebraska Bar Association, which was founded in 1899.

Mission 
The association works to help Nebraska attorneys achieve the highest standards of competence, ethics, and professionalism and to protect and promote the administration of and access to justice.

Structure
The NSBA is governed by a policy-making House of Delegates, whose members are elected; an Executive Council, consisting of one delegate elected from each of Nebraska's six Supreme Court districts; a chair and chair-elect, elected by the House of Delegates; and a president, president-elect, president-elect designate and immediate past president elected by active NSBA members.

The Bar requires Nebraska lawyers to complete 10 continuing education credits each year.

NSBA publishes Nebraska Lawyer Magazine, a monthly publication.

References

American state bar associations
Government of Nebraska
1937 establishments in Nebraska
Organizations established in 1937